Trinity Journal may refer to:

Trinity Journal (webzine), defunct webzine
Trinity Journal (theology), journal of Trinity Evangelical Divinity School
Trinity Journal (newspaper), newspaper based in Trinity County, California
A journal published by the Trinity School for Ministry